Y.G. Padmasiri is a Sri Lankan politician and a member of the Parliament of Sri Lanka.

References

Members of the Sabaragamuwa Provincial Council
Members of the 14th Parliament of Sri Lanka
1950 births
Living people